is a Japanese former professional footballer he is the current assistant manager of Sagan Tosu. 

Though naturally a central midfielder,  Kikuchi also operated as a central defender and a left-back.

Club career 
Kikuchi played for the Shimizu S-Pulse junior youth team and Shimizu Commercial High School, which has a strong soccer tradition with players such as Shinji Ono among its alumni. After graduating the school, he joined Júbilo Iwata and briefly loaned to Albirex Niigata. In 2002, he was invited to have a try-out at Arsenal and later went on to have another trial with Dutch team Feyenoord.

On June 13, 2007, Kikuchi was arrested in Hamamatsu city for the charge of a statutory rape on a 15-year-old high school student. He was suspended on indictment and released some days later. On June 29, 2007, he was sacked by the club after the scandal. The Japan Football Association imposed one-year suspension on him. After performing voluntary community service for some months, he moved to Germany and joined FC Carl Zeiss Jena.

In summer 2009, Kikuchi left FC Carl Zeiss Jena. After trialling with another German club, FC Schalke 04, he signed for Oita Trinita on July 27, 2009. In the winter of 2010, Kikuchi transferred from Oita to Albirex Niigata. Kikuchi retired at the end of the 2019 season.

International career
Kikuchi was part of the 2004 Olympic football team for Japan that exited the tournament in the first round, having finished last in group B behind the teams from Paraguay, Italy, and Ghana. He also had an impressive 2001 U-17 World Championship. He capped for Japan U-20 national team at the 2003 World Youth Championship.

He made his full international debut for Japan on January 6, 2010 in a 2011 AFC Asian Cup qualification against Yemen.

Career statistics

Club

International
Source:

References

External links
 
 
 Japan National Football Team Database
 
 
Profile at Hokkaido Consadole Sapporo

1984 births
Living people
Association football defenders
Association football people from Shizuoka Prefecture
Japanese footballers
Japan youth international footballers
Japan international footballers
J1 League players
J2 League players
2. Bundesliga players
3. Liga players
Júbilo Iwata players
Albirex Niigata players
FC Carl Zeiss Jena players
Oita Trinita players
Sagan Tosu players
Hokkaido Consadole Sapporo players
Avispa Fukuoka players
Olympic footballers of Japan
Footballers at the 2004 Summer Olympics
Japanese expatriate footballers
Expatriate footballers in Germany
Japanese expatriate sportspeople in Germany